Yew Tee is a  residential area in the West Region of Singapore. Yew Tee is a cluster of Housing and Development Board flats and private condominums,  As a relatively new estate, a large proportion of its residents are young families and middle income earners.

Etymology and history
Yew Tee is originally a village off Woodlands Road. During the Japanese Occupation of Singapore, oil was stored in the village and the village became known as Yew Tee ("oil pond" in Teochew).

The village used to have more than 300 families residing there which consists mostly of farmers growing vegetables and rearing ducks and chickens. In the 1980s, development of the area led to the villagers moving away from Yew Tee.

Housing
As part of the Choa Chu Kang New Town, all the apartments are built after 1993. Yew Tee is divided into two towns - Limbang and Yew Tee. Limbang has a smaller land area than Yew Tee. Yew Tee point serves Yew Tee residents while Limbang Shopping Center serves Limbang residents.

Infrastructure

Education
To cater to the mainly young families population of three neighbourhoods, there are several primary and secondary schools in Yew Tee. Primary schools consist of De La Salle School, Singapore, Kranji Primary School, Unity Primary School and Yew Tee Primary School. Secondary schools consist of Kranji Secondary School, Regent Secondary School and Unity Secondary School.

Transportation
Yew Tee has a MRT station, Yew Tee MRT station, built in 1996 as part of the 16-km Woodlands Extension. The town is served by public buses such as Service 302 and Service 307 from the Choa Chu Kang Bus Interchange. In Dec 2015, under the DTL2 Bukit Panjang Bus Service Enhancements, Service 979 was introduced to provide a vital link for Yew Tee residents to Bukit Panjang, the Downtown Line.  There are also new short-haul buses added to bring residents from Choa Chu Kang/ Yew Tee to Bukit Panjang MRT Station.

Recreation
There are 3 parks in Yew Tee, namely Limbang Park, Stagmont Park and Yew Tee Park. There is also a sports complex located within the vicinity of Yew Tee. In March 2009, a new shopping mall and condominium was opened. The shopping mall is known as Yew Tee Point and the condominium is known as Yew Tee Residences. The Pang Sua Canal park connector forms part of the Western Adventure Loop linking various parks in Yew Tee, Choa Chu Kang and Bukit Panjang. In 2019, Minister Lawrence Wong announced plans for a new integrated hub in Yew Tee. It will consist of a community club, HDB block, hawker centre, polyclinic as well as a kidney dialysis centre. It is set to be completed in 2026.

Army camps
The Kranji Camp was built in 1994 when Yew Tee was developed. Thereafter, the military police and Kranji Detention Barracks was moved in from the Woodlands Camp in 2000. There was a growing need for the expansion of Kranji Camp, called Kranji Camp II which was built in 2004. The Mowbray Camp and Police Dog K9 Unit was shifted from Ulu Pandan in 2003 to Kranji. The Kranji Camp III was built in 2009 to replace Ayer Rajah Camp and Portsdown Camp due to the redevelopment of one-North area for chemical sciences and lifestyle hub.

References

Places in Singapore
Choa Chu Kang
West Region, Singapore
Hokkien place names